The State Urban Search and Rescue Alliance or SUSAR is a non-profit organization designed to promote and support state urban search and rescue teams across the United States.

Background
SUSAR started informally with discussion between the task force leaders of several states, including South Carolina, New Jersey, Connecticut, Maryland, Georgia, Oklahoma, and Illinois. They decided that state level teams would benefit from a more formal exchange of ideas. The first meeting was in South Carolina in July 2005, and 18 states were represented, as well as Puerto Rico. By the second meeting the group had grown to 26 states. The State Urban Search and Rescue Alliance was formally adopted in August 2006 in Charlotte, North Carolina. As of March 2007, 41 states have joined the Alliance. The ninth meeting and conference will take place November 8–10, 2011 in Oklahoma City, Oklahoma.

Statement of purpose

Board of trustees
 Chairman R.B. Ellis - Oklahoma
 Vice-chairman Scott Merbach – Maryland
 Secretary-Treasurer Tina Toney - Oregon
 Doug Cooper - Alabama
 Scott Pierson – Illinois
 James Bastan - New Jersey
 Ronnie Register – Georgia
 Ron Zawlocki – Michigan
 David Martin – Texas
 Brian Toolan - Connecticut
 Dirk Christian – Kansas
 Ken Craft - Florida

See also
 Urban Search and Rescue
 Urban Search and Rescue South Carolina Task Force 1
 FEMA Urban Search and Rescue Task Force

References

External links
 State Urban Search and Rescue Alliance Official Website
  Federal Emergency Management Agency National Urban Search and Rescue Program

Rescue agencies
Emergency services in the United States
Rescue
Urban Search and Rescue Task Forces